The U.S. Department of Defense employs civilians who are stationed at military bases to work as firefighters. These personnel have their own uniforms and equipment, but are not considered to be members of a military unit. They are responsible for firefighting, but they may also receive aid from military units. Each U.S. Defense Department firefighter has his or her own uniform, usually a dark blue suit with a badge and a shoulder patch indicating his or her status.  They wear dark blue pants per United States Army regulation, but shirts can be dark blue, light blue, or white depending on the person's rank. This only applies to this organization, and not the Department of Defense.

Various certifications exist for personnel in this organization. One major certification is referred to as "Department of Defense(DoD) Fire & Emergency Services Training."  Firefighters must be Department of Defense Certified as Firefighter I, Firefighter II, HazMat Awareness and HazMat Operations, and Airport Firefighter. Additionally, the applicant must obtain and maintain a current Basic Life Support for the Healthcare Provider (CPR and AED) card.

See also
 Firefighting

External links
 Military Firefighter Heritage Foundation website.
 U.S. Defense Dept. Fire & Emergency Services Certification Program web page.
 History web page, dodfire.com
   Website for US Army civilian firefighter units, U.S. Army Installation Management Command
 fedfire.org, federal firefighters group in California.
 Fort knox firefighters website
 Fort knox firefighters patch website
 US Government document authorizing use of uniforms for civilian firefighters
  Dedication of memorial at military base in Texas
  DODFireNews.Com News web site for DOD Firefighters.

References

United States Department of Defense
Fire departments of the United States
Military fire departments
United States Department of Defense agencies